Platycryptus is a genus of jumping spiders that was first described by D. E. Hill in 1979.

Species
 it contains four species, found only in North America, Central America, and Brazil:
Platycryptus arizonensis (Barnes, 1958) – USA
Platycryptus californicus (Peckham & Peckham, 1888) – North, Central America
Platycryptus magnus (Peckham & Peckham, 1894) – Mexico to Brazil
Platycryptus undatus (De Geer, 1778) (type) – North America

References

External links
 Platycryptus at Bugguide.net

Salticidae genera
Salticidae
Spiders of North America
Spiders of South America